Capucine Anav (born April 22, 1991 in the 8th arrondissement of Lyon) is a French television host, actress and producer. She is a former columnist in the television program Touche pas à mon poste ! on C8.

Biography 

Capucine Anav was born on April 22, 1991, in the 8th arrondissement of Lyon. Her father owns many clothing stores across France and her mother is a sports coach

 In 2016, she starts her debut in the Touche pas à mon poste ! TV series in the episode of 8. She keeps some videos on Le Figaro.
 In March 2016, she left the show Le Mag.
 In 2017, she participated for the first time in Fort Boyard and second time in 2019 and then a third time in 2020.
 In 2018, she participated in and won the competition show Beauty Match on TFX.
 In 2019, Capucine joined the cast of the second season of the show Je suis une célébrité, sortez-moi de là ! on TF1.
 she was a columnist for the seventh season of Secret story in 2013
 For International Women's Day 2018, Capucine participated and in the Christina dans la Radio program on Fun Radio.
 On 1 March 2015, MIKL: No Limit, a program on Fun Radio
 On May 31, 2016,  she created Oroa Production. an audiovisual production company and she is the manager.
 In 2017 - 2018, she presented E-Sports European League , a video game program broadcast in the third part of the evening on C8 , on Sunday then on Saturday.
 She produces the web-series En coloc, humorous short films on the adventures of a “bunch of friends” in which she plays one of the main roles. The second season was shot and aired in 2018.
 In 2018, she appeared in an episode of Munch playing the role of a blogger.
 In 2019, she got a role in James Huth's film Rendez-vous chez les Malawas.

Personal life 
In May 2012, she joined the Secret Story show with two ex-companions, Yoann and Alexandre.

In 2014, she had a relationship of a few months with actor and comedian Kev Adams and Rayane Bensetti.

In 2014 to 2016, she was in a relationship with Louis Sarkozy, son of the President of the French Republic, Nicolas Sarkozy.

In 2017, she was in a relationship with Alain-Fabien Delon.  In 2020, she broke up with Alain-Fabien Delon.

Public magazine reveals that she is in a relationship with Jérémy Ferrari.

On television

As a facilitator

As a columnist

As a candidate

References

External links 

 

1991 births
Living people
French broadcasters
French television actresses
French television presenters